Ruggles Township is one of the fifteen townships of Ashland County, Ohio, United States. As of the 2010 census the population was 905.

Geography
Located in the northwestern corner of the county, it borders the following townships:
New London Township, Huron County - north
Rochester Township, Lorain County - northeast corner
Troy Township - east
Orange Township - southeast
Clear Creek Township - south
Butler Township, Richland County - southwest
Greenwich Township, Huron County - west
Fitchville Township, Huron County - northwest corner

No municipalities are located in Ruggles Township.

Name and history
It is the only Ruggles Township statewide.

This township is included in the region known as the Firelands and was originally a part of adjacent Huron County. It is named for Almon Ruggles, a surveyor retained by the Connecticut Land Company in 1808 and the first county recorder of Huron County.

Huron County was established by the Ohio General Assembly on February 7, 1809, and at the time comprised present-day Erie County (except a small part in the northwest), Huron County, Ruggles Township in Ashland County, Danbury Township in Ottawa County, and part of Catawba Island Township in Ottawa County - in short, the entire Firelands.

Ruggles Township was added to Ashland County when it was formed on February 24, 1846 from portions of Huron, Lorain, Richland, and Wayne counties.

Ruggles Township is home to Crittenden Farmhouse, a historic farmstead listed on the National Register of Historic Places.

Government
The township is governed by a three-member board of trustees, who are elected in November of odd-numbered years to a four-year term beginning on the following January 1. Two are elected in the year after the presidential election and one is elected in the year before it. There is also an elected township fiscal officer, who serves a four-year term beginning on April 1 of the year after the election, which is held in November of the year before the presidential election. Vacancies in the fiscal officership or on the board of trustees are filled by the remaining trustees.

References

External links
County website

Townships in Ashland County, Ohio
Townships in Ohio